Ryan P. McBroom (born April 9, 1992) is an American first baseman for the Hiroshima Toyo Carp of Nippon Professional Baseball (NPB). He previously played in Major League Baseball (MLB) for the Kansas City Royals.

Career

Amateur career
McBroom attended Holy Cross Academy in Fredericksburg, Virginia during his formative years of elementary and middle school.
He attended Courtland High School in Spotsylvania County, Virginia, and later West Virginia University.

The Kansas City Royals selected McBroom in the 36th round of the 2013 Major League Baseball draft, but he did not sign and returned to finish college.

Toronto Blue Jays
The Toronto Blue Jays selected McBroom in the 15th round of the 2014 Major League Baseball draft, and was assigned to the Vancouver Canadians of the Northwest League. In 70 games, McBroom batted .297 with 11 home runs and 59 RBI. His 11 home runs tied for the league lead. McBroom began the 2015 season with the Lansing Lugnuts. On June 5, he was named a Midwest League midseason All-Star. At that time, McBroom was batting .307 with 16 doubles. On August 24, McBroom was named the 2015 Midwest League MVP, becoming the third Blue Jays prospect to win the award after Kevin Pillar and Brian Dopirak. McBroom played in 127 games in 2015 for Lansing, and batted .315 with 12 home runs and 90 RBIs. He was assigned to the Advanced-A Dunedin Blue Jays to open the 2016 minor league season. McBroom played in 119 games for Dunedin in 2016, as well as nine games with the Double-A New Hampshire Fisher Cats. He would bat a combined .266 with 22 home runs and 85 RBIs. After the 2016 season, the Blue Jays assigned McBroom to the Mesa Solar Sox of the Arizona Fall League. He appeared in seven games for the Sox before being removed from the roster due to injury. He began 2017 with New Hampshire Fisher Cats.

New York Yankees
On July 23, 2017, McBroom was traded to the New York Yankees for Rob Refsnyder. The Yankees assigned him to the Trenton Thunder, where he spent the remainder of the 2017 season. In 134 total games between the two teams, he batted a combined .247 with 16 home runs and 70 RBIs. He split the 2018 season between Trenton and the Scranton/Wilkes-Barre RailRiders, hitting a combined .302/.348/.458/.806 with 15 home runs and 60 RBI. He returned to Scranton/Wilkes-Barre in 2019.

Kansas City Royals
On August 31, 2019, McBroom was traded to the Kansas City Royals in exchange for international bonus pool allotments and cash considerations or a PTBNL.

On September 3, 2019, the Royals selected McBroom's contract and promoted him to the major leagues. He made his debut that night versus the Detroit Tigers, recording his first major league hit off Daniel Norris. He hit .293 in 23 games for the Royals.

McBroom hit his first career home run on July 31, 2020. In total McBroom hit .247 with six home runs in 2020.

McBroom spent the 2021 season with the Triple-A Omaha Storm Chasers and the Royals. He only had eight at-bats with Kansas City, recording two hits (.250). McBroom played in 115 games with Triple-A Omaha, hitting .261 with 32 home runs and 88 RBIs. On November 1, 2021, McBroom was released by the Royals to pursue an opportunity in Asia.

Hiroshima Toyo Carp
On November 5, 2021, McBroom signed a $700,000 contract, that included a $300,000 signing bonus, with the Hiroshima Toyo Carp of Nippon Professional Baseball.

References

External links

1992 births
Living people
American expatriate baseball players in Canada
Baseball players from Virginia
Dunedin Blue Jays players
Hiroshima Toyo Carp players
Kansas City Royals players
Lansing Lugnuts players
Major League Baseball first basemen
Major League Baseball outfielders
Mesa Solar Sox players
New Hampshire Fisher Cats players
Omaha Storm Chasers players
Scranton/Wilkes-Barre RailRiders players
Sportspeople from Fredericksburg, Virginia
Tigres del Licey players
American expatriate baseball players in the Dominican Republic
Tomateros de Culiacán players
American expatriate baseball players in Mexico
Trenton Thunder players
Vancouver Canadians players
West Virginia Mountaineers baseball players